Jermaine Gonsalves (born 14 December 1976) is a British professional basketball player, currently playing for Sheffield Sharks in the British Basketball League.

Born in Leicester, England, the 5'11" Guard made his BBL debut starring for the Leicester Riders in 1997, aged 20, against Worthing Bears. Gonsalves left the Riders in 1999, but resigned two years later for a four-year stint. In 2005, he left the professional outfit and joined their second division feeder club, Leicester Warriors. It was here that he was reunited with his former Riders teammates Drew Barrett and Hilroy Thomas. He played with the Warriors for one season only before making the step back up to the top tier, signing for the Sharks in 2006.

As a player, Jermaine is known for his hard-nosed defensive style and the enthusiastic outlook he brings to a team's locker room. Jermaine has always endeavored to be involved with the wider community of the clubs he has played for. This has involved coaching in local schools and leisure centers, where he has worked alongside local young basketball players to develop their fundamental skills.

It is also worthy to note that professional sports run in the family for Jermaine. He is the cousin of both basketball player Karl Brown and professional football player Emile Heskey. Karl Brown has experienced success in America as a young man, playing for the Georgia Institute of Technology behind the legendary point guard Kenny Anderson and by enjoying a long and fruitful professional career in both Italy and the UK. Emile Heskey is an English international who is currently playing in the British Premier League for Aston Villa.

References

1976 births
Living people
English men's basketball players
Sheffield Sharks players
Sportspeople from Leicester